The National Hot Rod Reunion is a gathering of nostalgia drag racers, street rodders and automotive enthusiasts based on the California Hot Rod Reunion.  The first four years of the National Hot Rod Reunion were held at Beech Bend Park in Bowling Green, Kentucky.  The event has been held in Ohio, but has returned to Bowling Green where the event has been established as the main site since 2008.

Organization
The event is organized by and benefits the Wally Parks NHRA Motorsports Museum, a non-profit organization affiliated with the National Hot Rod Association.  It includes nostalgia drag race events, a parade of street rods, vendors and a swap meet.  It is held on the grounds of National Trail Raceway.

Auto racing organizations in the United States
Automobile museums in California
Drag racing events
Sports museums in California